Auchinleck is a village  southeast of Mauchline, and  northwest of Cumnock in East Ayrshire, Scotland.

Surrounding the village is Auchinleck Estate, centred on Auchinleck House, past home of the lawyer, diarist and biographer James Boswell, 9th Laird of Auchinleck.

History
Auchinleck is in the heart of the ancient Kyle district of Scotland. The small locality of Auchincloich has a comparable meaning.

Although record of a community exists from as early as 1239, reliable records can really only be said to date from the arrival of the Boswell family in 1504. The barony of Auchinleck had been forfeited to the crown and was granted by King James IV to his "good and faithful servant" Thomas Boswell.

The Boswells proved to be assiduous in their estate husbandry, and by the early 1700s a viable village community and a thriving estate had begun to emerge from the surrounding barren moorland. The New Statistical Account of 1837 documents early mining and quarrying in the area which was to become the impetus for the region to boom. By 1881 the parish population had blossomed and was 6,681, four times what it had been in 1831

Nationalisation of coal in 1947 brought investment and with the building of the Barony Power Station, which was commissioned in 1957, the future of the region seemed assured. However, within 30 years the fortunes of the area, so tied to coal, followed the spectacular demise of deep pit mining. Lacking an economic source of fuel as mines closed, the power station shut down in 1989, High House pits closed in 1983, and Auchinleck village subsided into post-industrial recession. However, with the recent acquisition and subsequent development of Dumfries House in the area by Prince Charles, Duke of Rothesay, and with new building taking place in the area there are signs of 'green shoots'.

Sport
The village is home to the junior football club Auchinleck Talbot, who play at the 4,000-capacity Beechwood Park. The club, one of the most successful in Scotland at that level, share a fierce rivalry with near neighbours Cumnock Juniors in the West of Scotland Super League Premier Division.

Education

Auchinleck has two primary schools, namely Auchinleck Primary School and St Patrick's Primary School. The town's secondary school, Auchinleck Academy, closed in late 2020, with pupils moving to the new Robert Burns Academy. This is part of the Barony Campus in Cumnock which has incorporated a number of local schools and nurseries into one site.

Notable people

 James Crystal: parish minister for over 50 years and Moderator of the General Assembly of the Church of Scotland 1879–80
Kris Doolan: professional footballer for Partick Thistle in the Scottish Championship. Currently one of the club's record-breaking goalscorers. Previously played at local club Auchinleck Talbot.
 Alexander Boswell, Lord Auchinleck (1706–1782), judge and father of James Boswell.

See also
List of places in East Ayrshire
List of listed buildings in Auchinleck, East Ayrshire
Auchinleck railway station
Medieval turf building in Cronberry
Back Rogerton
Wallace's Cave, Auchinleck

References

External links
 East Ayrshire Forums - Tenants Portal
 Place-Names of the Coalfield Communities: The name Auchinleck

 
Towns in East Ayrshire
Mining communities in Scotland